PointBase is relational database management system (RDBMS) written in the Java programming language.

History
In 1998, Bruce Scott, a co-founder of the Oracle Corporation (with Larry Ellison, Bob Miner and Ed Oates), started PointBase Inc. with Jeff Richey (an architect of Sybase) and Daren Race. It was written in pure Java, supported DCOM and CORBA, and was an object–relational database. It was designed to integrate the internet and databases. PointBase Inc. was established in San Mateo, California, then moved to Mountain View, California. Like Java, PointBase was aimed at portable devices.

In the early 2000s it was the database that was shipped for free with the Java platform.

In 2003, the database was acquired by DataMirror of Markham, Ontario.

In September 2007, IBM acquired DataMirror.

Today (2012) PointBase's SQL Engine is part of Oracle's WebLogic platform.

Applications
It has been shipped with the Oracle WebLogic Server, a Java EE server.

PointBase is supported only for the design, development, and verification of applications; it is not supported for enterprise-quality deployment. The evaluation license of PointBase has a database size limit of 30 MB.

Versions
 PointBase Server Edition
 PointBase Mobile Edition

See also
 SmallSQL

References

External links
 History of PointBase
 Guide to PointBase
 Oracle BEA WebLogic Pointbase Reference

Java (programming language) software
Relational database management systems
Computer-related introductions in 1998